Linsleyonides albomaculatus is a species of beetle in the family Cerambycidae. It was described by Champlain and Knull in 1922.

References

Elaphidiini
Beetles described in 1922